Bayat-e Sofla (also Romanized as Bayāt-e Soflá; also known as Bayāt-e Pā’īn) is a village in Owch Tappeh-ye Gharbi Rural District, Torkamanchay District, Meyaneh County, East Azerbaijan Province, Iran. At the 2006 census, its population was 391, in 89 families.

References 

Populated places in Meyaneh County